Better Dead Than Alien is a fixed shooter published in 1988 for the Amiga, Atari ST, Commodore 64 and MS-DOS by Electra.

A fixed shooter allowing some vertical movement, the player takes control of hero Brad Zoom's ship in his quest to save civilization from aliens. The game is full of humor and the intro screen is in magazine style.

References

External links

1988 video games
Amiga games
Atari ST games
Commodore 64 games
Fixed shooters
Multiplayer and single-player video games
Video games about extraterrestrial life
Video games developed in the United Kingdom